The Mutton Renaissance Campaign was founded in 2004 by King Charles III (then Prince of Wales) to advocate for the consumption of mutton (and not lamb) by Britons. The King, whose favourite dish is mutton, also aimed to support British sheep farmers struggling to sell their older animals. The Renaissance Campaign sought to create a specific new definition for mutton, which is that the meat has to be traceable to an origin on a particular farm where the animal was fed on forage (rather than high-concentration grain), from an animal older than two years, and after slaughter has been aged for two weeks by hanging. The organization's website (www.muttonrenaissance.org.uk) also maintained lists of restaurants serving mutton as well as places to buy the meat in the UK.

See also
Mutton Curry

Footnotes

References
 
 
 
 

2004 establishments in the United Kingdom
Agricultural organisations based in the United Kingdom
Charles III
Food industry trade groups
Sheep farming in the United Kingdom